NGC 3324 is an open cluster in the southern constellation Carina, located northwest of the Carina Nebula  at a distance of  from Earth. The two are often confused as a single object, and together have been nicknamed the "Gabriela Mistral Nebula" due to its resemblance to the Chilean poet.  was first catalogued by James Dunlop in 1826.

The Hubble Space Telescope observed a western section of NGC 3324 in detail, and the same section was one of the first observations of the James Webb Space Telescope, for comparison.

Nearby clusters 
NGC 3324 is associated with the open cluster NGC 3293. Both are fairly young, at around 12 million years old. They show some degree of mass segregation, with more massive stars concentrated near their centers. Neither are dynamically relaxed.

Gallery

References

External links 
 
 

Carina (constellation)
3324
IC objects
Open clusters
18260501
Articles containing video clips